{{Infobox election
| election_name = 2004 United States Senate election in Washington
| country = Washington
| type = presidential
| ongoing = no
| previous_election = 1998 United States Senate election in Washington
| previous_year = 1998
| next_election = 2010 United States Senate election in Washington
| next_year = 2010
| election_date = November 2, 2004
| image_size = x145px
| image1 = Patty Murray official portrait.jpg
| nominee1 = Patty Murray
| party1 = Democratic Party (United States)
| popular_vote1 = 1,549,708
| percentage1 = 55.0%
| image2 = George Nethercutt (high-resolution portrait).jpg
| nominee2 = George Nethercutt
| party2 = Republican Party (United States)
| popular_vote2 = 1,204,584
| percentage2 = 42.7%
| map_image = 2004 United States Senate election in Washington results map by county.svg
| map_size = 275px
| map_caption = County resultsMurray:    Nethercutt:    
| title = U.S. Senator
| before_election = Patty Murray
| before_party = Democratic Party (United States)
| after_election = Patty Murray
| after_party = Democratic Party (United States)
}}

The 2004 United States Senate election in Washington''' was held on November 2, 2004. Incumbent Democrat U.S. Senator Patty Murray won re-election to a third term, defeating Republican U.S. Representative George Nethercutt. She became only the fourth Washington senator to win 3 consecutive terms, just after fellow Democrats Warren G. Magnuson and Scoop Jackson. Nethercutt was known for having defeated Tom Foley, the sitting Speaker of the House of Representatives, as part of the 1994 Republican wave. 

Term limits became an issue in the campaign, as Democrats seized on Nethercutt's broken term-limits pledge that he had made when he had unseated Foley in 1994. Geography was also against Nethercutt, who was severely hampered by his lack of name recognition in the more densely populated western part of the state, home to two-thirds of the state's population. Washington has not elected a Senator from east of the Cascades since Clarence Dill in 1928. Other important issues included national security and the war in Iraq. Nethercutt supported the invasion of Iraq, while Murray opposed it. 

Nethercutt was considered a heavy underdog from the start, and his campaign never gained much traction. In November, he lost by 12 points, receiving 43 percent of the vote to Murray's 55 percent. He only carried two counties west of the Cascades.

Major candidates

Democratic 
 Patty Murray, incumbent U.S. Senator

Republican 
 George Nethercutt, U.S. Representative

General election

Predictions

Polling

Results 
The election was not close, with Murray winning by 12.24% of the vote. Although Murray failed to win any counties in the eastern part of the state, she pulled down big margins from the western part of the state, which is significantly more populated. Specifically, Murray trounced Nethercutt in King County, home of Seattle, the most populous county in the state. Murray was sworn in for a third term on January 3, 2005.

See also 
 2004 United States Senate elections

Notes

References 

2004 Washington (state) elections
Washington
2004